The 2017 World Polo Championship was held at the Sydney Polo Club. The Championship rights were awarded to the club itself. This is unusual as the normal process is to award it to a country. The Sydney Polo Club was offered the opportunity to bid because of their unparalleled fields and grounds. The Australian Polo Federation is in support of the Sydney Polo Club.

Destination NSW is the strategic Sponsor of the 2017 World Polo Championship hosted by the Sydney Polo Club. The event took place in October 2017. The tournament saw the world's eight best nations compete for the world title in Sydney's Hawkesbury region.

Fixture and Results

Pool Results
 P. Round
 Results

Knockout stages

References

2017
Polo competitions in Australia
Sports competitions in Sydney
World Polo Championship, 2017